Mark Edmund Smith,  is a British physicist, academic, and academic administrator. He specialises in nuclear magnetic resonance (NMR) and materials physics. Since October 2019, he has been the President and Vice-Chancellor  of University of Southampton, having previously held the office of Vice-Chancellor of Lancaster University, and Professor of Solid State NMR in its Department of Chemistry since 2012. He has previously lectured at the University of Kent and the University of Warwick.

Early life and education
Smith was born and brought up in Suffolk, England. studied natural sciences at Churchill College, Cambridge, and graduated from the University of Cambridge with a Bachelor of Arts (BA) degree. He undertook postgraduate research in physics at the University of Warwick, graduating with a Doctor of Philosophy (PhD) degree.

Smith began his career as an application scientist and worked for Bruker Analytische Messtechnik (part of the Bruker Corporation) in Germany. He then worked as a research scientist in the Division of Materials Science at Commonwealth Scientific and Industrial Research Organisation (CSIRO) in Australia.

Academic career
Smith's research specialises in nuclear magnetic resonance (NMR) and materials physics.

In 1992, Smith returned to England and began his academic career, having been appointed a lecturer at the University of Kent. He was later promoted to reader in solid-state nuclear magnetic resonance.

In 1998, Smith moved to the University of Warwick where he had been appointed a reader in its Department of Physics. He was later promoted to Professor of Physics. He was appointed Chair of the Faculty of Science in 2005 and Pro-Vice-Chancellor for Research in 2007. On 1 May 2010, he was appointed Deputy Vice-Chancellor (DVC), making him the second most senior academic at the University of Warwick. As DVC, he deputised for the Vice-Chancellor of the university when needed, and was in charge of all academic resourcing issues (with a budget of £240 million), of human resources and of the university's capital program.

Lancaster University
On 5 August 2011, Smith was announced as the next Vice-Chancellor of Lancaster University. He took up the post on 1 January 2012, becoming the university's sixth Vice Chancellor since it was established. He was also appointed Professor of Solid State NMR in the Department of Chemistry. He was paid £271,000 in 2012/13 academic year and £281,000 in 2013/14 academic year.

University of Southampton
In April 2019, it was announced that Smith would be moving to the University of Southampton as its next President and Vice-Chancellor. He took up the appointments on 1 October 2019.

External appointments
Outside of his university work, Smith has held a number of appointments. In 2012 and 2013, he chaired a review into the content of A-Levels. From 1 January 2013 to 31 December 2015, he was a member of the Higher Education Funding Council for Wales. In December 2014, he became a trustee of Jisc (previously called the Joint Information Systems Committee). , he is the Chair of the Board of the Higher Education Careers Service Unit.

Honours
Smith is an elected Fellow of the Institute of Physics (FInstP). He was appointed Commander of the Order of the British Empire (CBE) in the 2019 Birthday Honours for services to research and higher education.

References

Living people
British physicists
British materials scientists
Academics of Lancaster University
Academics of the University of Warwick
Academics of the University of Kent
Alumni of Churchill College, Cambridge
Scientists  from Suffolk
Alumni of the University of Warwick
Fellows of the Institute of Physics
Year of birth missing (living people)
Vice-Chancellors of the University of Southampton
Commanders of the Order of the British Empire